According to Greek Mythology, Ἡδῠ́λόγος (Hēdylógos, 'sweet-voiced, flattering') was one of the seven Erotes, the winged gods of Love. He was the god of sweet-talk and flattery. 

Although not mentioned in any existing literature, he is depicted on ancient Greek vase paintings. A surviving example on a red-figure pyxis from the late 5th century BC shows Hedylogos alongside his brother Pothos drawing the chariot of Aphrodite.

In the Latin of the Romans, he was called Hedylogus. His name means somebody who speaks gently, softly mesmerizing people with his words. Apart from ἡδῠ́λόγος (Ancient Greek, hēdylógos, pronounced idilogos), there are several other Greek words which describe this unique ability: μελιστάλακτος and μελισταγής, which can be translated as mellifluous.

References 
 Harvey Alan Shapiro, Personifications in Greek art, Akanthus 1993;

External links 
 Hedylogos in The Theoi Project

Greek love and lust deities
Love and lust gods
Greek gods
Children of Aphrodite
Personifications in Greek mythology
Erotes